Jean-Claude Taffin de Givenchy (May 5, 1925 – May 18, 2009) was a French aristocrat, businessman, perfumer and owner of Parfums Givenchy.

Early life 
Jean-Claude Taffin de Givenchy was the eldest son of Lucien Taffin de Givenchy, Marquis of Givenchy (1888–1930) and Béatrice-dit-Sissi (née Badin; 1888–1976). He was raised alongside his younger brother, later fashion designer Hubert de Givenchy (1927–2018). The family originally hailed from Venice, Italy, the original spelling being Taffini. The family was ennobled in 1713 at which they became Marquis of Givenchy and started carrying the name suffix de. When he was barely five years of age, he lost his father to influenza. From then on he and his brother were brought up by his mother and maternal grandmother in Beauvais, France. His maternal grandfather Jules Badin (1843–1919) was the owner and director of the historic Gobelins Manufactory and Beauvais tapestry factories.

Career 
Jean-Claude, as the elder of the brothers, inherited the family's marquessate.

He started his career as an executive for Air France in New York City, but upon request in 1952 of his brother Hubert he returned to Beauvais to manage the Parfums Givenchy, which he later owned and was sold to Bernard Arnault's LVMH alongside the Givenchy fashion house.

Family 
De Givenchy was married to American-born Patricia Marie Myrick (1926–2012). They had seven children:

 Richard Taffin de Givenchy (1948–2021) 
 Patrick Taffin de Givenchy 
 Philippe Taffin de Givenchy 
 Hubert Taffin de Givenchy
 Béatrice Taffin de Givenchy 
 James Taffin de Givenchy (born 1963)
 Olivier Taffin de Givenchy (born 1964), French-American financier and region head of JPMorgan Chase

After his divorce of his first wife, he married Ellen (née Ahr), with whom he had stepdaughter Elizabeth Funkhouser de Givenchy (née Funkhouser), and moved back to France where they settled in Chateauneuf-de-Grasse.

References 

1925 births
2009 deaths